In enzymology, a trans-zeatin O-beta-D-glucosyltransferase is an enzyme that catalyzes the chemical reaction

UDP-glucose + trans-zeatin  UDP + O-beta-D-glucosyl-trans-zeatin

Thus, the two substrates of this enzyme are UDP-glucose and trans-zeatin, whereas its two products are UDP and O-beta-D-glucosyl-trans-zeatin.

This enzyme belongs to the family of glycosyltransferases, specifically the hexosyltransferases.  The systematic name of this enzyme class is UDP-glucose:trans-zeatin O-beta-D-glucosyltransferase. Other names in common use include zeatin O-beta-D-glucosyltransferase, uridine diphosphoglucose-zeatin O-glucosyltransferase, and zeatin O-glucosyltransferase.

References

 

EC 2.4.1
Enzymes of unknown structure